Smiling at Strangers is the second studio album by Australian Hip Hop album by TZU, released in September 2005. The album was produced by Magoo (Regurgitator and Butterfingers) and released under the Liberation Music record label. The album peaked at number 71 on the ARIA charts.

The album was later re-released as a limited edition double album entitled, Snarling at Strangers.

Track listing
 "Hey Ok" - 3:23
 "She Gets Up" - 4:00
 "Logical" - 2:50
 "Recoil" - 5:00
 "Tzu Blues (Sweet Little Hoochie)" - 4:31
 "Won't Get Played" - 5:52
 "Coming Round" - 6:16
 "In Front Of Me" - 3:38
 "Back To Front" - 3:09
 "Reminisce" - 4:52
 "Lounge" - 4:09
 "Raise 'Em Up" - 3:13
 "Unnecessarily Blue" - 5:21
 "Unnecessarily Blue (Remix)" - 7:55

Charts

References

TZU albums
2005 albums